Trigonoscuta is a genus of broad-nosed weevils in the family of beetles known as Curculionidae. There are at least 60 described species in Trigonoscuta.

Species
These 67 species belong to the genus Trigonoscuta:

 Trigonoscuta anacapensis Pierce, 1975 i c g
 Trigonoscuta arenicola Pierce, 1975 i c g
 Trigonoscuta baileyae Pierce, 1975 i c g
 Trigonoscuta blaisdelli Pierce, 1975 i c g
 Trigonoscuta brunneotesselata Pierce, 1975 i c g
 Trigonoscuta carneyi Pierce, 1975 i c g
 Trigonoscuta catalina Pierce, 1975 i c g
 Trigonoscuta clemente Pierce, 1975 i c g
 Trigonoscuta coxcombi Pierce, 1975 i c g
 Trigonoscuta cronise Pierce, 1975 i c g
 Trigonoscuta cruzi Pierce, 1975 i c g b
 Trigonoscuta curviscroba Pierce, 1975 i g
 Trigonoscuta dalei Pierce, 1975 i c g
 Trigonoscuta deserti Pierce, 1975 i c g
 Trigonoscuta dorothea Pierce, 1975 i c g
 Trigonoscuta franciscana Pierce, 1975 i c g
 Trigonoscuta gualalae Pierce, 1975 i c g
 Trigonoscuta hendryi Pierce, 1975 i c g
 Trigonoscuta hilariae Pierce, 1975 i c g
 Trigonoscuta holtvillei Pierce, 1975 i c g
 Trigonoscuta hopkinsi Pierce, 1975 i c g
 Trigonoscuta horni Pierce, 1975 i c g
 Trigonoscuta imbricata Van Dyke, 1936 i c g
 Trigonoscuta kanakoffi Pierce, 1975 i c g
 Trigonoscuta kelsoensis Pierce, 1975 i c g
 Trigonoscuta masoni Pierce, 1975 i c g
 Trigonoscuta miguelensis Pierce, 1975 i c g b
 Trigonoscuta mohawki Pierce, 1975 i c g b
 Trigonoscuta montereyensis Pierce, 1975 i c g
 Trigonoscuta morroensis Pierce, 1975 i c g
 Trigonoscuta muguensis Pierce, 1975 i c g
 Trigonoscuta nesiotis Pierce, 1975 i c g
 Trigonoscuta nicolana Pierce, 1975 i c g
 Trigonoscuta nigromaculata Pierce, 1975 i c g
 Trigonoscuta oxnardi Pierce, 1975 i c g
 Trigonoscuta paleni Pierce, 1975 i c g
 Trigonoscuta paloverdensis Pierce, 1975 i c g
 Trigonoscuta parkeri Pierce, 1975 i c g
 Trigonoscuta pilosa Motschulsky, 1853 i c g
 Trigonoscuta pismoensis Pierce, 1975 i c g
 Trigonoscuta pseudopilosa Pierce, 1975 i c g
 Trigonoscuta pusilla Pierce, 1975 i c g
 Trigonoscuta pusilloides Pierce, 1975 i c g
 Trigonoscuta reyesiana Pierce, 1975 i c g
 Trigonoscuta rossi Pierce, 1975 i c g
 Trigonoscuta rothi Pierce, 1975 i c g
 Trigonoscuta rozeni Pierce, 1975 i c g
 Trigonoscuta sanclementis Pierce, 1975 i c g
 Trigonoscuta sanctabarbarae Pierce, 1975 i c g
 Trigonoscuta sanctarosae Pierce, 1975 i c g
 Trigonoscuta sandieginis Pierce, 1975 i c g
 Trigonoscuta sanluisi Pierce, 1975 i c g
 Trigonoscuta setosa (Casey, 1888) c g
 Trigonoscuta setosus (Casey, 1888) i
 Trigonoscuta sleeperi Pierce, 1975 i c g
 Trigonoscuta somertoni Pierce, 1975 i c g
 Trigonoscuta sonoma Pierce, 1975 i c g
 Trigonoscuta stantoni Sleeper, 1975 i c g b (Stanton's trigonoscuta weevil)
 Trigonoscuta tesselata Pierce, 1975 i
 Trigonoscuta tessellata Pierce, 1975 c g
 Trigonoscuta tinkhami Pierce, 1975 i c g
 Trigonoscuta variabilis Pierce, 1975 i c g
 Trigonoscuta viridata Pierce, 1975 i c g
 Trigonoscuta viridicans Pierce, 1975 i c g
 Trigonoscuta yermoensis Pierce, 1975 i c g
 Trigonoscuta yorbalindae Pierce, 1975 i c g
 Trigonoscuta yumaensis Pierce, 1975 i c g

Data sources: i = ITIS, c = Catalogue of Life, g = GBIF, b = Bugguide.net

References

Further reading

 
 
 
 
 
 
 
 
 

Entiminae